Martin Jirouš (born 27 November 1986 in Ústí nad Labem)  is a professional Czech footballer. He currently plays for Wiener SK in the Austrian Regional League.

Jirouš finished as top scorer in the 2008–09 Czech 2. Liga, scoring 18 goals.

Jirouš played the first half of the 2011–12 Gambrinus liga on loan at FK Dukla Prague, however he was restricted to just two substitute appearances due to knee problems.

References

External links
 
 
 Guardian Football

1986 births
Living people
Czech footballers
Czech First League players
FC Slovan Liberec players
FK Čáslav players
1. FK Příbram players
FK Baník Sokolov players
AC Sparta Prague players
FK Dukla Prague players
SK Sigma Olomouc players
Bohemians 1905 players
Czech expatriate footballers
Expatriate footballers in Austria
Czech expatriate sportspeople in Austria
Association football forwards
Czech Republic youth international footballers
Sportspeople from Ústí nad Labem